The Embassy of the Islamic Republic of Afghanistan in Tokyo (Dari: په جاپان کې د افغانستان سفارت : Pashto: سفارت افغانستان در ژاپن ; Japanese: 駐日アフガニスタン大使館) is the Islamic Republic of Afghanistan's diplomatic mission to Japan. It is also accredited to the Philippines and Singapore. The embassy is located in Minato-ku, Tokyo. The current Afghan ambassador to Japan is Shaida Mohammad Abdali, who presented his credentials in May 2021.

History 
The first permanent Afghan diplomatic presence in Japan was established in 1933 with the opening of a legation in Tokyo. The legation was located at 7 Aoba-cho, Shibuya-ku, Tokyo.

In 1944 the legation closed and evacuated its staff to Karuizawa to avoid Allied bombing raids of Tokyo. In 1956 Afghanistan upgraded its legation in Tokyo to an embassy.

During the rule of the Islamic Emirate of Afghanistan from 1996 to 2001, the embassy remained closed. After the 2001 US invasion of Afghanistan, a new government was formed in Kabul that reestablished diplomatic relations with Japan. The embassy was reopened on December 26, 2002.

In July 2008 the embassy relocated from its property at 3-37-8-B Nishihara Shibuya-ku, Tokyo 151-0066, to its current location in Azabudai, Minato, Tokyo. The building the embassy currently occupies was a conference center for Japanese central government agencies.

Following the Fall of Kabul to the Taliban in August 2021, the Islamic Republic of Afghanistan was dissolved and replaced by the Islamic Emirate of Afghanistan. The embassy continues to represent the internationally recognized government of Afghanistan and not the Islamic Emirate government. The embassy does not receive financial assistance from the Taliban government and has cut 70% of its staff following the collapse of the Islamic Republic government. The remaining diplomats do not receive pay.

Library 
The embassy has a library containing over 4000 books in Pashto, Dari, English, and Japanese. The doors to the library room are handmade, created by a traditional craftsman in Kabul.

Building 
The embassy has four floors, as well as a rooftop patio with views of Tokyo Tower. An elevator connects all four floors and the roof. Two of the floors are below ground and the other two are above ground.

First floor 
Storage.

Second floor 
The second floor contains the office of the ambassador, consular office, archive room, and workspaces for the rest of the staff. A kitchen, library, and prayer room are also on this floor.

Third floor 
The third floor is on ground level and possesses the embassy's grand main entrance and event hall. A dining room and reception area are also on this floor. The majority of official receptions and events are hosted here.

Fourth floor 
The fourth floor is the ambassador's official residence.

See also 
Afghanistan-Japan relations

List of ambassadors of Afghanistan to Japan

References 

Diplomatic missions of Afghanistan
Diplomatic missions in Japan
Buildings and structures in Tokyo
Minato, Tokyo